Nelson Martínez (15 July 1951 – 12 December 2018) was a Venezuelan politician who served as the Minister of Petroleum (2017) and President of PDVSA (2017). Martínez died due to health complications on 12 December 2018.

References

1951 births
2018 deaths
Venezuelan politicians
Prisoners who died in Venezuelan detention
Venezuelan people who died in prison custody
Presidents of PDVSA